"Peacock" is a song by American singer Katy Perry, taken from her third studio album, Teenage Dream (2010). Because the song was filled with suggestive lyrics pertaining to male genitalia, Capitol Records initially opposed the idea of including it on her record. Similar to what happened with another song of hers – "I Kissed a Girl" (2008) – she refused to withdraw it from the record. "Peacock" was panned by music critics and, musically, was compared to the 1980s song "Mickey" by Toni Basil, and Gwen Stefani's "Hollaback Girl" (2005). On March 26, 2012, a remix version was released as promotional single on iTunes.
 
Despite not being released as a single, the song entered several music charts worldwide. Its least successful charting territory was the United Kingdom, while it performed best in the US, topping the Billboard Dance Club Songs chart for a week, and has been certified Platinum by the RIAA. Perry has performed "Peacock" on several occasions, including during her 2011 world tour California Dreams Tour. When performing the track, the singer usually wears colorful or glittery clothing.

Production
Mikkel S. Eriksen, Tor Erik Hermansen, and Ester Dean assisted Perry in writing "Peacock" for her third studio album, Teenage Dream, released in 2010. According to Perry, the whole point of writing "Peacock" was to play with words. Midway through recording the album, Perry recalled saying to the people she was working with: "Look I've got a lot of jewels, but I really don't have the crown. I really don't have that full-blown presentation". So she then decided to get back into the studio and work with Stargate, a production team co-producing Teenage Dream, during a late-night session and made several more songs, including "Firework" and "Peacock".

Originally, the singer's recording label, Capitol Records, was against the inclusion of the song as a track on Teenage Dream as they deemed "Peacock" too controversial. "They were all a bit worried about the word 'cock' and it gave me déjà vu because they did the exact same thing with 'I Kissed a Girl,'" Perry stated. Unhappy with the idea of making her music more family friendly, she insisted on including the songs the label objected to. "They said, 'We don't see it as a single, we don't want it on the album.' And I was like, 'You guys are idiots'." When asked about "Peacock", Perry stated: "I'm hoping it will be a gay-pride anthem, peacocks represent a lot of individuality..... It's not just like, 'I wanna see your bulge. And then she went on to clarify: "It does have the word cock in it, but art is also in fart! It's all in how you look at it." Prior to the release of Teenage Dream, the singer debuted "Peacock" in early August 2010 when she performed it at the MTV World Stage in Malaysia.

Composition

"Peacock" is a dance-pop song, with an up-tempo house music beat, that lasts for three minutes and 51 seconds. The song is composed in the key of G minor and is set in time signature of common time, with a tempo of 138 beats per minute. Perry's vocal range spans over an octave, from B3 to D5. Lyrically, the track contains a double entendre with suggestive wording. New York magazine writer Willa Paskin observed that Perry did the obvious with the song's hook ("she used a common word for penis and made it mean penis!").
Paskin also wrote that "Peacock" could perhaps be the most outrageous example of an entirely obvious double entendre. Perry herself has considered it to be the biggest innuendo in the world. During an interview with MTV News, the singer said that she is a fan of using puns and double entendres and often looks for ways to incorporate it into her material. In the song, Perry repeatedly asks to see their peacock, if they are "brave enough" to do so. Its composition was compared to Toni Basil's cheerleader anthem "Mickey" by many reviews as both songs are stomping jams, bursting with double meanings.
Leah Greenblatt of Entertainment Weekly dubbed it a shamelessly silly revival of Basil's 1980s track. Rob Sheffield from Rolling Stone noticed the two songs shared a drum hook, and thought of "Peacock" as a sequel to Gwen Stefani's 2005 single, "Hollaback Girl".

Critical reception
The track garnered generally negative reviews and criticism from critics, who mostly criticized the song's "cock, cock, cock" line. Greg Kot from the Chicago Tribune said that "Peacock" adapting the beat from Basil's "Mickey" into a suggestive metaphor "barely qualifies as an off-color joke let alone a song." Stephen Thomas Erlewine from AllMusic found the singer to have distinguished herself through "desperate vulgarity". Erlewine concluded: "All this stylized provocation is exhausting, and not just because there's so much of it (none of it actually arousing). It's tiring because, at her heart, Perry is old-fashioned and is invested in none of her aggressive teasing."

Elysa Gardner from USA Today advised people who buy the album to skip the song. In his negative review for the album, Matthew Cole of Slant Magazine found it difficult to think of a song more unrefined or more irritating than "Peacock". He believed all reviews of Teenage Dream will discuss the track, which will be because it is "potentially historic in its badness, to the point that, once you've heard it, you too will have to describe it to other people just to convince yourself that it really exists." Spin magazine writer Mikael Wood remarked that the song contains a double entendre that even a performer such as Kesha could find crude.

Writing in music website Sputnikmusic, Rudy Klapper said she would bet that "Peacock" would "never [be] seeing the light of day, primarily because it's a terrible song with a double entendre so blunt it would make Ke$ha blush". Klapper also said the lyrics do not complement Perry's writing skills. The Washington Post staff writer Chris Richards' review of the track was also negative. Talking about how hooks on Teenage Dream are catchy, but quickly start to erode if listeners pay more attention to the words, he cited "Peacock" as an example of this. Describing its chorus as "an earworm of the highest order," he said some of the lyrics are enough to make people clench their teeth.

Chart performance
Despite not being released as a single, "Peacock" managed to chart in some territories. The song peaked at number fifty-six on the Canadian Hot 100 and performed similarly in the Czech Republic, where it charted at number fifty-two. The UK Singles Chart was where "Peacock" had its lowest charting entry. In the week ending on September 11, 2010, the track found its peak at number one-hundred-twenty-five. On Billboards US Dance Club Songs, the song had its highest peak position. After eight weeks of appearing on the chart, "Peacock" reached the top spot, replacing La Roux's "In for the Kill", on December 4, 2010. However, by next week, it was superseded by the Richard Vission song "I Like That". The song also reached number five on the Billboard Bubbling Under Hot 100 Singles chart. In June 2014, the song was certified Platinum by the RIAA for selling one million copies.

Live performances and cover versions

For most performances of "Peacock", the singer usually dons a glittery aquamarine bustier or a colorful piece of clothing attached to her back that is to resemble peacock feathers. Perry's first performance of the song took place during August 2010 at the MTV World Stage. The stage she performed on included props such as lifesize candy canes, background dancers dressed up like candy canes and a video of a blue eye surrounded by peacock feathers playing in the backdrop. While dancing across the stage, Perry wore a white glitter unitard and tutu.

In November, Perry also performed "Peacock" at New York's Roseland Ballroom, where she introduced herself by popping out of a giant cake, dressed in a purple skin-tight cupcake print dress. Additionally, Perry included "Peacock" in her setlist for her worldwide concert tour, California Dreams Tour (February 2011 – January 2012). When singing the song, the performance would include an elaborated feathered fan dance number. She wore a turquoise/green one-piece swimsuit with a peacock tail attached accompanied by female dancers dressed in a similar way, two male dancers and mimes. Concert reviewer Jim Abbott for the Orlando Sentinel felt that detailed performances such as the ones done for "Peacock" were a highlight for the singer's tour.

Monthly LGBT-interest magazine The Advocate called "Peacock" "very gay". Ryan James Yezak, who had already parodied another of Perry's songs, "California Gurls", did the same for "Peacock". While fewer than James Yezak's parody of the former, his "Peacock" video received more than 130,000 reviews on the internet just two days after its release.

The song was included on the 2016 film, How to Be Single.

Track listing
Digital download – Cory Enemy & Mia Moretti Remix
 "Peacock" (Cory Enemy & Mia Moretti Remix) – 5:32

Digital download – Yuksek Remix
 "Peacock" (Yuksek Remix) – 4:19

Credits and personnel
Credits adapted from the Teenage Dream liner notes.

Assistant: Tim Robbins
Mixers: Serban  Ghenea
Mix engineer: John Hanes
Producers: Stargate
Recorders: Mikkel S. Eriksen, Miles Walker
Backing vocals, Lead vocals: Katy Perry
Writers: Katy Perry, Mikkel S. Eriksen, Tor Erik Hermansen, Ester Dean

Charts

Certifications

See also
List of Billboard Hot Dance Club Songs number ones of 2010

References

External links
 

2010 songs
Katy Perry songs
LGBT-related songs
Songs written by Katy Perry
Songs written by Tor Erik Hermansen
Songs written by Mikkel Storleer Eriksen
Song recordings produced by Stargate (record producers)
Songs written by Ester Dean